The 2021 Tre Valli Varesine was the 100th edition of the Tre Valli Varesine road cycling one day race, which was held in the Lombardy region of northwestern Italy on 5 October 2021. This edition was the race's first in the UCI ProSeries; the 2020 edition was expected to feature in the inaugural UCI ProSeries but was cancelled due to the COVID-19 pandemic. The race was the second of the 2021 Trittico Lombardo, which also included the Coppa Bernocchi held the day before and the Coppa Ugo Agostoni, to be held six days later.

The  race began in Busto Arsizio, with the first  of the race heading north and entering midway through the short circuit in and around Varese. After climbing the Casbeno hill, which crested with just under a kilometre from the finish line, riders passed through the finish line for the first time. Riders then took on eight laps of a  circuit that was used in the 2008 UCI Road World Championships, with each lap featuring the Montello and Casbeno hills. Following this, the race concluded with two laps of a longer  circuit that added the Morosolo and Casciago hills in between Montello and Casbeno.

Teams 
There were five non-starters from five separate teams (and ). In total, 161 riders started the race, of which only 41 finished.

UCI WorldTeams

 
 
 
 
 
 
 
 
 
 
 
 
 
 
 

UCI ProTeams

 
 
 
 
 
 
 
 

UCI Continental Teams

Result

References

External links 
 

2021
Tre Valli Varesine
Tre Valli Varesine
Tre Valli Varesine